Marius Noubissi (born 28 November 1996) is a Cameroonian football player who plays for Valenciennes FC in the Ligue 2.

Club career
He made his professional debut in the Tunisian Ligue Professionnelle 1 for CS Sfaxien on 15 February 2015 in a game against Étoile du Sahel.

References

External links
 
 

1996 births
Living people
Cameroonian footballers
Cameroon under-20 international footballers
Les Astres players
CS Sfaxien players
Cameroonian expatriate footballers
Expatriate footballers in Tunisia
Tunisian Ligue Professionnelle 1 players
Gil Vicente F.C. players
Expatriate footballers in Portugal
Liga Portugal 2 players
Cameroonian expatriate sportspeople in Tunisia
Cameroonian expatriate sportspeople in Portugal
Association football forwards
Cameroonian expatriate sportspeople in Belgium
Expatriate footballers in Belgium
Cameroonian expatriate sportspeople in Finland
Veikkausliiga players
FC Ilves players
Expatriate footballers in Finland
K Beerschot VA players
Belgian Pro League players
Challenger Pro League players
Valenciennes FC players
Ligue 2 players
Cameroon youth international footballers
Footballers from Yaoundé